Onderdonk is a surname. Notable people with the surname include:

Andrew Onderdonk (1848–1905), construction contractor 
Benjamin Treadwell Onderdonk (1791-1861), bishop of the Episcopal Diocese of New York
Henry Ustick Onderdonk (1789–1858), second Episcopal bishop of Pennsylvania
Julian Onderdonk (1882–1922), American Impressionist painter
Robert Jenkins Onderdonk (1852-1917), American painter and art teacher